Kenneth or Ken Martin may refer to: 
 Kenneth Martin (English painter), English painter and sculptor
 Ken Martin (Australian sculptor)
 Kenneth Martin (judge), Australian judge
 Kenneth Martin (cricketer), New Zealand cricketer
 Ken Martin (athlete), American long-distance runner
 Ken Martin (politician), Minnesota politician